R1 RCM Inc. is an American revenue cycle management company servicing hospitals, health systems and physician groups across the United States. The company provides end-to-end revenue cycle management services as well as modular services targeted across the revenue cycle including pre-registration, financial clearance, debt collection, charge capture, coding, billing and follow-up, u and denials management.

History
R1 RCM was founded as Accretive Health in 2003 by Mary Tolan and Michael Cline. Tolan served as the company's president, chief executive officer, and board director until 2013. Cline served as board chairman between 2009 and 2013. 

In 2012, responding to a Senate inquiry, the company stated that nine thefts of patient data-bearing company laptops had occurred in 2011, and that 30 company laptops had lacked encryption. As a consequence, in 2013, Accretive Health entered into a 20-year settlement with the Federal Trade Commission over its data security measures. 

In July 2012, Accretive Health entered into a $2.5 million settlement with the Minnesota Attorney General following an investigation into the company's debt collection practices. The company admitted no wrongdoing. Accretive Health was barred from operating in Minnesota for two to six years under a settlement agreement announced July 30th, 2012 by Minnesota Attorney General Lori Swanson. 

In April 2013, Mary Tolan stepped down as CEO. Tolan was replaced by former Dell executive Stephen Schuckenbrock. 

In March 2014, as a result of missed financial restatements, Accretive Health was delisted from the New York Stock Exchange. Over-the-counter trading continued.

On July 21, 2014, Emad Rizk replaced Schuckenbrock as CEO. 

In December 2014, the company restated certain previously filed financial statements and, in June 2015, announced that they had completed their 2014 SEC filings The company filed its 2015 Q2 10-Q with the SEC in August 2015.

In 2015, Ascension selected Accretive Health as its exclusive hospital revenue cycle partner. As part of the transaction, Ascension and TowerBrook Capital Partners invested $200M to support growth initiatives at Accretive Health. 

In 2017, Accretive Health was renamed as R1 RCM.

In mid-2017, R1 RCM announced a further expansion of the agreement with Ascension to include an additional $1.5B in net patient revenue handled, which included physician group revenue cycle services.

In June of 2020 R1 RCM acquired the RevWorks business line of the Cerner Corporation.\
|url=https://www.r1rcm.com/news/r1-completes-acquisition-of-revworks|

In August 2020 R1 RCM was hit with a ransomware attack.

In April 2021 R1RCM acquired SCI Solutions, a provider of digital patient engagement solutions.
|url=https://www.r1rcm.com/news/r1-completes-acquisition-of-sci-solutions|

In May 2021 R1 RCM announced the agreement with Mednax (a medical group specializing in prenatal, neonatal, and pediatric services), to provide it's revenue cycle services. 
|url=https://www.r1rcm.com/news/r1-and-mednax-announce-enterprise-rcm-agreement|

In July of 2021 R1 RCM acquired VisitPay, a provider patient digital payment solutions. 
|url=https://www.r1rcm.com/news/r1-completes-acquisition-of-visitpay|

In January of 2022, R1 RCM acquired CloudMed, a provider of revenue intelligence and automation. 
|url=https://www.r1rcm.com/news/r1-rcm-to-acquire-cloudmed-creating-strategic-revenue-partner|

References

External links

Financial services companies of the United States
Companies based in Utah
Financial services companies established in 2003
Health care companies based in Utah
Companies listed on the Nasdaq
2003 establishments in Illinois
2010 initial public offerings